Harpalus semipunctatus is a species of ground beetle in the subfamily Harpalinae. It was described by Dejean in 1829.

References

aesculanus

Beetles described in 1829